Brissett is a surname. Notable people with the surname include:

Annette Brissett, Jamaican reggae singer
Jacoby Brissett (born 1992), American football player
Jason Brissett (born 1974), English footballer
Oshae Brissett (born 1998), Canadian basketball player
Trevor Brissett (1961–2010), English footballer